Articles relating to the relationship of Israel and Palestine with the United Nations include:

Israel and the United Nations
List of United Nations resolutions concerning Israel
Palestine and the United Nations
List of United Nations resolutions concerning Palestine